BitBake is a make-like  build tool with the special focus of distributions and packages for embedded Linux cross compilation, although it is not limited to that. It is inspired by Portage, which is the package management system used by the Gentoo Linux distribution. BitBake existed for some time in the OpenEmbedded project until it was separated out into a standalone, maintained, distribution-independent tool. BitBake is co-maintained by the Yocto Project and the OpenEmbedded project.

BitBake recipes specify how a particular package is built. Recipes consist of the source URL (http, https, ftp, cvs, svn, git, local file system) of the package, dependencies and compile or install options. They also store the metadata for the package in standard variables. During the build process, recipes are used to track dependencies, performing native or cross-compilation of the package and package it so that it is suitable for installation on the local or a target device. It is also possible to create complete images consisting of a root file system and kernel. As a first step in a cross-build setup, the framework will attempt to create a cross-compiler toolchain suited for the target platform.

See also 

 Buildroot
 Yocto Project
 OpenEmbedded
 Openmoko
 MontaVista Software
 List of build automation software

References

External links
 BitBake README file
 BitBake User Manual
 

Embedded Linux
Build automation
Free software programmed in Python